Mutum Bijen Singh (born 10 February 1979) is a retired Indian professional footballer who played as a forward. He played most of his professional career for East Bengal in the National Football League and I-League.

Career
Born in Imphal, Manipur, Bijen Singh graduated from the Tata Football Academy in 1997 and began his professional career with Kolkata giants East Bengal where he went on to play for five seasons, before moving out to Dempo in 2002. At Dempo, he spent a single season before returning to East Bengal in 2003 where he played a pivotal role in the famous 2003 ASEAN Club Championship triumph and then the National Football League title.

Bijen made his International debut against Japan in the 2006 World Cup Qualifiers. He made two appearances for the national team, both against Japan.

East Bengal
In 1997, after graduating from the Tata Football Academy, Bijen Singh joined East Bengal FC and went on to play for the next five seasons, and once again returning in 2003 to play two more seasons for the club. In his 7 seasons with the Red and Gold brigade, Bijen Singh won a total of 18 trophies for the club, including two National Football League titles, the famous ASEAN Club Championship title, three IFA Shield titles, Durand Cup title, five Calcutta Premier Division titles and few others.

Bijen Singh was named as the captain of East Bengal in the 2000–01 season, where the team won their maiden National Football League title.

Bijen Singh was pivotal in the club's success in the 2003 ASEAN Club Championship in Jakarta where he partnered with Bhaichung Bhutia to take East Bengal to the final of the tournament. He scored the all-important winner against Persita Tangerang in the Quarter-Finals of the tournament.

Bijen was prolific in the 2003-04 season as he scored 6 goals in all competitions which earned him a callup to the national team.

Honours

East Bengal
ASEAN Club Championship (1): 2003
National Football League (2): 2000–01, 2003–04
Super Cup (1): 1997
IFA Shield (3): 1997, 2000, 2001
Durand Cup (1): 2004
Calcutta Premier Division (5): 1998, 1999, 2000, 2003, 2004
San Miguel International Trophy (1): 2004
McDowell Cup (2): 1997, 2000
All Airlines Gold Cup (2): 1998, 2001

India U23
 LG Cup: 2002

Manipur
Santosh Trophy: 2002–03

References

External links
 

1979 births
Living people
People from Imphal
Indian footballers
India international footballers
India youth international footballers
East Bengal Club players
Dempo SC players
Mohammedan SC (Kolkata) players
Salgaocar FC players
Association football defenders
Footballers from Manipur
I-League players
Footballers at the 2002 Asian Games
Asian Games competitors for India